CFU may refer to:

 Cambridge Fans United, fans of the English football team Cambridge United F.C.
 Canadian Freelance Union, a Canadian trade union for freelance media contributors
 Caribbean Football Union, the nominal governing body for Caribbean football
 Cedar Falls Utilities, a municipally-owned public utility located in Cedar Falls, Iowa
 Ceramic Fuel Cells Ltd (ASX and LSX code), an Australian fuel cell technology company
 Children's Film Unit, a British film production company & educational charity
 Colony-forming unit, a measure of viable bacterial or fungal numbers
 Commercial Farmers' Union, a trade union in Zimbabwe
 Community Fire Unit, a New South Wales, Australia-based residential volunteer fire protection organisation
 Corfu International Airport (IATA airport code), an airport on the Greek island of Corfu at Kerkyra
 Croatian Fraternal Union, a Croatian diaspora club in the United States